List of Federal Roads in Malaysia

Peninsular Malaysia

Main Federal Roads

Institutional facilities federal roads

FELDA/FELCRA Federal Roads

Industrial Federal Roads

 а

Unclassified Federal Roads

Sarawak

Sabah

Main Federal Roads

Institution facilities federal roads

FELDA/FELCRA Federal Roads

Labuan

Main Federal Roads

(Source:Public Works Department Malaysia (JKR))

References

[http://www.data.gov.my/data/dataset/3d10dc31-67f3-4807-b970-f23532fd4fad/resource/1488b948-c749-4884-aa5e-f1f22f9c9e96/download/kkr-dtsa-01-01-001daftarjalanpersekutuanutamanegeridanlebuhrayabertol.xlsx}

Malaysian Federal Roads
Federal